Tantoyuca is a city in the Mexican state of Veracruz. Popularly known as "the Pearl of the Huastecas", it is located in the state's Huasteca Alta region. 
It serves as the municipal seat of the surrounding municipality of Tantoyuca.

In the 2005 INEGI Census, the city of Tantoyuca reported a total population of 23,893.

Name
"Tantoyuca" comes from the Tenek "tan-tuyik", which means "place of wax."

History
Tantoyuca was founded by Huastec people in pre-Hispanic times. It was conquered by the Mexica Triple Alliance in the late 15th or early 16th centuries. It was given town  (villa)  status on 12 April 1850 and city (ciudad) status on 25 July 1901.

References

External links

Tantoyuca Web page of the Veracruz State Govt. Accessed 6 November 2008.

Populated places in Veracruz